David Percy Pagan  (born September 15, 1949) is a former professional baseball pitcher. He played all or part of five seasons in Major League Baseball from 1973 until 1977, and was a member of the Seattle Mariners' 1977 inaugural season roster.

Career
Pagan joined the New York Yankees organization in 1970. After three seasons in their farm system, he received his first call up to the majors in 1973, making the start in the second game of a July 1 double header with the Cleveland Indians. After escaping a jam in the first inning, Pagan was pulled in the second with the bases loaded and nobody out, and one run already in. He was far more effective in a second appearance made in relief on July 7 before returning to the minors. After compiling an 8–5 record and 2.03 earned run average between the West Haven Yankees and Syracuse Chiefs, he rejoined the Yankees that September.

Pagan split the next two seasons between the Yankees and Syracuse. He made the opening day roster for the first time in 1976 as a member of the Yankees' bullpen, but made just two starts with the club. He was acquired along with Rick Dempsey, Scott McGregor, Tippy Martinez and Rudy May by the Baltimore Orioles from the Yankees for Ken Holtzman, Doyle Alexander, Elrod Hendricks, Grant Jackson and Jimmy Freeman in a blockbuster at the trade deadline on June 15, 1976.

After going 1–4 with a 5.98 ERA the rest of the way for Baltimore, he was selected by the Seattle Mariners in the 1976 Major League Baseball expansion draft. He was traded to the Pittsburgh Pirates for a player to be named later on July 27, 1977, and made one appearance with the club that September against the New York Mets. After two more seasons playing minor league ball in the Pirates organization, he retired.

Sources

External links
, or Retrosheet, or Pelota Binaria (Venezuelan Winter League)

1949 births
Living people
Baltimore Orioles players
Baseball people from Saskatchewan
Canadian expatriate baseball players in Mexico
Canadian expatriate baseball players in the United States
Cardenales de Lara players
Canadian expatriate baseball players in Venezuela
Columbus Clippers players
Fort Lauderdale Yankees players
Johnson City Yankees players
Kinston Eagles players
Major League Baseball pitchers
Major League Baseball players from Canada
Mexican League baseball pitchers
New York Yankees players
Oneonta Yankees players
People from Nipawin, Saskatchewan
Pittsburgh Pirates players
Portland Beavers players
Seattle Mariners players
Spokane Indians players
Syracuse Chiefs players
Tigres del México players
West Haven Yankees players